King's Meadow is a park in Reading, Berkshire, England, located next to the River Thames. It stretches from the Coal Woodland (so-called because it used to be the site of a coal heap ) to King's Meadow Road near Reading Bridge. The Thames Path long distance footpath runs through the length of King's Meadow, which is visible from the railway when entering or leaving Reading railway station from the eastern side.

King's Meadow forms part of a series of riverside open spaces, managed by Reading Borough Council, that stretch along one or other side of the River Thames throughout its passage through Reading. From west to east these are Thameside Promenade, Caversham Court, Christchurch Meadows, Hills Meadow, View Island and King's Meadow.

History 
King's Meadow was a possession of Reading Abbey and became owned by the King after the dissolution of the monasteries. In 1869 the town of Reading purchased  of the meadow as a recreation ground. This area has long been used as the site of a variety of public events such as Reading market, a race course, Reading shows and fairs.

It is also the location of the once disused King's Meadow swimming pool, which was built there in 1903.  The future of the building was a subject of local controversy until 2015 when Reading Borough Council approved a renovation project to turn it into the Thames Lido. The restoration was completed in 2017; as well as reopening the pool, there is a restaurant, small spa and private dining facilities..

Features 
The park's landscape is open fields of short grass right up to the river bank, with some perimeter trees and an avenue from Napier Road. It is a popular picnic site with groups of mature trees. The park is prone to flooding, but there are playing fields used by the public and football clubs throughout the year.

There is a pleasant walk along the towpath up to Reading Bridge and Caversham Lock is at the eastern end. It is also a popular spot for mooring and fishing. To the east of the park is a large Tesco supermarket.

Events 

It is the location of several annual events in Reading, such as Reading Pride LGBTA festival and the annual Reading Beer Festival.

References

External links 

 Page on Kings Meadow and the Coal Woodland from Reading Borough Council

Parks and open spaces in Reading, Berkshire
Water-meadows
Meadows in Berkshire